The Journal of Latin American Studies, established in 1969, is a peer-reviewed academic journal published by Cambridge University Press. The Institute of Latin American Studies of the University of London houses the journal's editorial and administrative offices.

Abstracting and indexing 
The journal is abstracted and indexed in Geo Abstracts, Current Contents, Social Sciences Citation Index, Arts and Humanities Citation Index, IBZ International Bibliography of Periodical Literature, and MLA Bibliography.

References

External links 
 

Latin American studies journals
Publications established in 1969
Cambridge University Press academic journals
Quarterly journals
English-language journals